Activin receptor type-1B is a protein that in humans is encoded by the ACVR1B gene.

ACVR1B or ALK-4 acts as a transducer of activin or activin-like ligands (e.g., inhibin) signals.  Activin binds to either ACVR2A or ACVR2B and then forms a complex with ACVR1B. These go on to recruit the R-SMADs SMAD2 or SMAD3. ACVR1B also transduces signals of nodal, GDF-1, and Vg1; however, unlike activin, they require other coreceptor molecules such as the protein Cripto.

Function 

Activins are dimeric growth and differentiation factors which belong to the transforming growth factor-beta (TGF-beta) superfamily of structurally related signaling proteins. Activins signal through a heteromeric complex of receptor serine kinases which include at least two type I (I and IB) and two type II (II and IIB) receptors. These receptors are all transmembrane proteins, composed of a ligand-binding extracellular domain with a cysteine-rich region, a transmembrane domain, and a cytoplasmic domain with predicted serine/threonine specificity. Type I receptors are essential for signaling, and type II receptors are required for binding ligands and for expression of type I receptors. Type I and II receptors form a stable complex after ligand binding, resulting in phosphorylation of type I receptors by type II receptors. This gene encodes activin A type IB receptor, composed of 11 exons. Alternative splicing and alternative polyadenylation result in 3 fully described transcript variants. The mRNA expression of variants 1, 2, and 3 is confirmed, and a potential fourth variant contains an alternative exon 8 and lacks exons 9 through 11, but its mRNA expression has not been confirmed.

Interactions 

ACVR1B has been shown to interact with
 ACVR2A, and ACVR2B

References

External links

Further reading 

 
 
 
 
 
 
 
 
 
 
 
 
 
 
 
 
 
 
 

GS domain
TS domain
S/T domain
Human proteins
EC 2.7.11